The Church of St. Paul is a Roman Catholic parish church in the Roman Catholic Archdiocese of New York, located in the East Harlem neighborhood of Manhattan, New York City. The sixth parish established in New York City, it was designated a New York City Landmark on June 28, 2016.

History
Before 1834 the only Catholic north of Canal Street was St. Patrick's Old Cathedral. Rev. James Walsh and others said Mass in houses and barns in the outlying areas when a congregation could be gathered. Bishop John Dubois decided to establish a parish on 117th Street and asked Rev. Michael Curran to take charge. Curran had been a missionary in the mountains of Pennsylvania and had come highly recommended by Father Demetrius Augustine Gallitzin. His knowledge of Gaelic served him well among his widely scattered parishioners. The cornerstone of St. Paul's church was set June 29, 1835. In 1843, Curran resigned the pastorate in order to return to Ireland for a time.

During Fr. Maguire's tenure the church was substantially enlarged and rededicated by Archbishop John McCloskey on July 9, 1871. Dr. McQuirk had the old school demolished in 1905 and a new one built on the site. While a new church was being built, services were held in the school auditorium. A new rectory was also built. The demographics of the area, which had been predominantly Irish, gradually changed to reflect more Spanish speaking Catholics. Msgr. Drew initiated a Spanish program.

It has been staffed by the Institute of the Incarnate Word Fathers since 1998. In 1892, the parish address was 121 E 117th St. In 2015 the parish of Holy Rosary was merged with St. Paul's.

Pastors
 Fr. Michael Curran, 1834-1843
 Fr. John Walsh, 1843-1853
 Fr. George R. Brophy, 1853-1866
 Fr. Eugene Maguire, 1866-1883
 Fr. John McQuirk D.D., 1883-1924
 Fr. Thomas F. Kane, 1924-1940
 Msgr. Cornelius J. Drew, 1940-1943
 Msgr. John c. Mulcahy, 1943-1946
 Rev. James V. Hart, 1946-
 Fr. Ray Burn 1964-

Building
The church is of brick over a steel frame, with a limestone façade. Completed in 1908, it was designed in the Romanesque Revival style by the firm of Neville & Bagge. During Fr. Kane's tenure a marble altar rail and a solid oak roredos were installed.

St. Paul's School
In 1870 Father Eugene Maguire established the parish school, which was under the care of the Sisters of Charity of New York. Since 1850 the Sisters, from the mother house at McGowan's Pass, had taught catechism at St. Paul's. The Carmel Hill Program, established by philanthropist Aiden Ruane provides tuition assistance to over 30 students.

See also 
 List of New York City Designated Landmarks in Manhattan
 National Register of Historic Places listings in New York County, New York

References

External links
 Parish of St. Paul and of Holy Rosary website

New York City Designated Landmarks in Manhattan
Religious organizations established in 1834
Roman Catholic churches in Manhattan
East Harlem
1834 establishments in New York (state)